Coprosma parviflora, also called leafy coprosma, is a shrub that is native to New Zealand. C. parviflora naturally occurs on the Three Kings Islands and in the northern North Island.

References

parviflora
Flora of New Zealand
Taxa named by Joseph Dalton Hooker
Plants described in 1852